A macaroni (formerly spelled maccaroni) was a pejorative term used to describe a fashionable fellow of mid-18th-century England. Stereotypically, men in the macaroni subculture dressed, spoke, and behaved in an unusually sentimental and androgynous manner. 

The term "macaroni" pejoratively referred to a man who "exceeded the ordinary bounds of fashion" in terms of high-end clothing, fastidious eating, and gambling. He mixed Continental affectations with his English nature, like a practitioner of macaronic verse (which mixed English and Latin to comic effect), laying himself open to satire.

The macaronis became seen in stereotyped terms by the English aristocracy, being seen as a symbol of inappropriate bourgeois excess, effeminacy, and possible homosexuality, which was then legally viewed as sodomy. Many modern critics view the macaroni as representing a general change in 18th century English society such as political change, class consciousness, new nationalisms, commodification and consumer capitalism. 

The macaroni was the Georgian-era precursor to the dandy of the Regency and Victorian eras.

Origins and etymology 
In the 18th century, wealthy young British men traditionally took a trip around Europe upon their coming of age, known as his Grand Tour. Italy was a key destination of these tours. During their trip, many developed a taste for maccaroni, a type of pasta little known in England then, and so they were said to belong to the Macaroni Club. They would refer to anything that was fashionable or à la mode as "very maccaroni". 

Author Horace Walpole wrote to a friend in 1764 of "the Macaroni Club [Almack's], which is composed of all the travelled young men who wear long curls and spying-glasses". The expression was particularly used to characterize "fops" who dressed in high fashion with tall, powdered wigs with a chapeau-bras on top that could only be removed on the point of a sword.

The shop of engravers and printsellers Mary and Matthew Darly in the fashionable West End of London sold their sets of satirical "macaroni" caricature prints, published between 1771 and 1773. The new Darly shop became known as "the Macaroni Print-Shop".

Design historian Peter McNeil links macaroni fashion to the crossdressing of the earlier molly subculture, and says "some macaronis may have utilized aspects of high fashion in order to affect new class identities, but others may have asserted what we would now label a queer identity".

The Italian term maccherone, when figuratively meaning "blockhead, fool", was apparently not related to this British usage, though both were derived from the name of the pasta shape.

Examples of usage
In 1773, James Boswell was on tour in Scotland with the stout and serious-minded essayist and lexicographer Dr. Samuel Johnson, the least dandified of Londoners. Johnson was awkward in the saddle, and Boswell ribbed him: "You are a delicate Londoner; you are a maccaroni; you can't ride."

In Oliver Goldsmith's She Stoops to Conquer (1773), a misunderstanding is discovered and young Marlow finds that he has been mistaken; he cries out, "So then, all's out, and I have been damnably imposed on. O, confound my stupid head, I shall be laughed at over the whole town. I shall be stuck up in caricatura in all the print-shops. The Dullissimo Maccaroni. To mistake this house of all others for an inn, and my father's old friend for an innkeeper!"

The song "Yankee Doodle" from the time of the American Revolutionary War mentions a man who "stuck a feather in his hat and called it macaroni." Dr. Richard Shuckburgh was a British surgeon and also the author of the song's lyrics; the joke which he was making was that the Yankees were naive and unsophisticated enough to believe that a feather in the hat was a sufficient mark of a macaroni. Whether or not these were alternative lyrics sung in the British army, they were enthusiastically taken up by the Americans themselves.

The macaroni penguin was probably given this name because of its prominent crests.

See also

Dandy
Metrosexual
Hipster

Notes

References
Rictor Norton, "The Macaroni Club: Homosexual Scandals in 1772" in Homosexuality in Eighteenth-Century England: A Sourcebook
The Lewis Walpole Library, Yale: "Preposterous Headdresses and Feathered Ladies: Hair, Wigs, Barbers, and Hairdressers" Exhibition, 2003.
 A Queer Taste for Macaroni

1760s fashion
1770s fashion
History of clothing (Western fashion)
Human appearance
English clothing
Terms for men
Effeminacy